Also see: Sports in Evansville.

The Evansville Express were a full-contact women's outdoor football team of the National Women's Football Association. The team officially became part of the NWFA and began playing league games in 2004. The Express disbanded following the 2005 season.

Home games for the Express were played at the Goebel Soccer Complex multipurpose field in Evansville, Indiana.

Season-By-Season 

|-
| colspan="6" align="center" | Evansville Express (NWFA)
|-
|2003 || 0 || 7 || 0 || 4th Southern Midwest || --
|-
|2004 || 0 || 8 || 0 || 3rd Southern Midwest || --
|-
!Totals || 0 || 15 || 0
|colspan="2"| (including playoffs)

References

Sports in Evansville

National Women's Football Association teams
Sports in Evansville, Indiana
Defunct American football teams in Indiana
Women's sports in Indiana